Podgóry may refer to the following places:
Podgóry, Masovian Voivodeship (east-central Poland)
Podgóry, Puck County in Pomeranian Voivodeship (north Poland)
Podgóry, Słupsk County in Pomeranian Voivodeship (north Poland)